The 2002–03 SEC women's basketball season began with practices in October 2002, followed by the start of the 2002–03 NCAA Division I women's basketball season in November. Conference play started in early January 2003 and concluded in March, followed by the 2003 SEC women's basketball tournament at the Alltel Arena in North Little Rock, Arkansas.

Preseason

Preseason All-SEC teams

Coaches select 5 players
Players in bold are choices for SEC Player of the Year

Rankings

SEC regular season

Postseason

SEC tournament

Honors and awards

All-SEC awards and teams

References

 
Southeastern Conference women's basketball seasons